Vampires Stole My Lunch Money is a 1978 album by the UK underground artist Mick Farren.

Farren had left music performance after his 1970 album Mona – The Carnivorous Circus to concentrate on journalism and writing. However, in 1976 he had the opportunity whilst in New York to record the single "Play With Fire"/"Lost Johnny" reigniting his interest in performing again. The Screwed Up EP followed in 1977, recorded for Stiff Records and featuring Larry Wallis, Paul Rudolph, Alan Powell and Andy Colquhoun.

Newly formed Logo Records approached Farren with the possibility of re-releasing some of his material but were delighted when he expressed a preference for recording new material. Retaining his band, minus Rudolph who had returned to his native Canada, the group recorded this album which featured guest appearances from fellow NME journalist Chrissie Hynde, Curved Air singer Sonja Kristina, former Dr. Feelgood guitarist Wilko Johnson and harmonica player Will Stallibrass.

"Half Price Drinks"/"I Don't Want to Go This Way" was released as a single from the album, followed by the non-album single "Broken Statue"/"It's All in the Picture".

Critical reception
LA Weekly, in a retrospective article, called the album "a sonic car crash of self-degradation." Trouser Press called it a "solo masterwork," writing that Farren "dishes out a harrowingly honest collection of songs about drinking, dissolution, depression, self-destruction and desperation. About as powerful as rock gets, this nakedly painful LP is most definitely not recommended to sissies, moralists and born-again Christians."

Track listing
All tracks composed by Mick Farren and Larry Wallis; except where indicated

"Trouble Coming Everyday" (Frank Zappa)
"Half Price Drinks" 
"I Don’t Want to Go This Way" 
"I Want a Drink"
"Son of a Millionaire" 
"Zombie Line" 
"Bela Lugosi" (Farren, Andy Colquhoun)
"People Call You Crazy" (Farren, Andy Colquhoun)
"Fast Eddie" (Farren, Andy Colquhoun)
"Let Me In, Damn You" 
"(I Know From) Self Destruction" (Farren)
"Drunk in the Morning"

Personnel
Mick Farren – vocals
Larry Wallis – guitar, bass
Andy Colquhoun – guitar, bass
Alan Powell – drums
with
Chrissie Hynde – vocals
Sonja Kristina – vocals
Wilko Johnson – guitar
Will Stallibrass – harmonica
Technical
Dave Goodman - executive producer
Chas Herington - engineer
Pearce Marchbank - photography

References

1978 albums
Mick Farren albums